Richard Cadell (born 23 March 1969) is a British illusionist, puppeteer, actor and screenwriter, best known for being the in-vision presenter and the hand of puppet Sooty since succeeding Matthew Corbett in 1998.

He is a Gold Star Member of the Inner Magic Circle and Past President of the British section of the International Brotherhood of Magicians.

He once owned Brean Leisure Park in the coastal village of Brean in Burnham-on-Sea, Somerset, from 2002–2014. He also works as a consultant for TV and stage productions.

Biography
In June 2008 (Sooty's 60th Anniversary), Richard, together with his brother David, reportedly paid close to £1 million for the global rights for the Sooty brand through their new company, Cadells Ltd. As well as annually touring with live shows, Cadell is credited as the co-writer and executive producer of the Sooty television series which is currently transmitted daily on ITVBe.

Cadell's involvement with Sooty began with a guest appearance on a Christmas episode of The Sooty Show in 1985; then in the last series of Sooty & Co., he and Liana Bridges joined the cast as employees of the titular store.

References

External links
The Official Sooty Website

Living people
English television presenters
English puppeteers
English magicians
1969 births